Favorite son refers to a politician with strong regional or party support. 

Favorite Son may also refer to:

 Favorite Son (film), a 1997 film
 Favorite Son (miniseries), a 1988 American TV miniseries
 "Favorite Son" (Star Trek: Voyager), an episode of the American TV series Star Trek: Voyager
 "Favorite Son", an episode of the American sitcom Yes, Dear
 "Favorite Son", a song by Green Day from their 2004 promo single "American Idiot"
 "Favorite Son", a song from the 1991 musical The Will Rogers Follies

See also
 Favourite Sons, an American indie rock band